1196 Sheba, provisional designation , is a metallic asteroid from the middle region of the asteroid belt, approximately 25 kilometers in diameter. It was discovered on 21 May 1931 by astronomer Cyril Jackson at Johannesburg Observatory, South Africa.

Sheba is a metallic X-type asteroid and orbits the Sun at a distance of 2.2–3.1 AU once every 4 years and 4 months (1,581 days). Its orbit has an eccentricity of 0.18 and an inclination of 18° with respect to the ecliptic. The body's observation arc, however, begins at Johannesburg, four months after its official discovery observation.

This minor planet was named after the biblical Queen of Sheba, who visited King Solomon. Naming citation was first published by Paul Herget in The Names of the Minor Planets in 1955.

References

External links 
 Asteroid Lightcurve Database (LCDB), query form (info )
 Dictionary of Minor Planet Names, Google books
 Asteroids and comets rotation curves, CdR – Observatoire de Genève, Raoul Behrend
 Discovery Circumstances: Numbered Minor Planets (1)-(5000) – Minor Planet Center
 
 

001196
Discoveries by Cyril Jackson (astronomer)
Named minor planets
1196 Sheba
001196
19310521